Eldora Township is a township in Hardin County, Iowa, USA.

History
Eldora Township was created in the 1850s.

References

Townships in Hardin County, Iowa
Townships in Iowa
1850s establishments in Iowa